Kajori is a Bangladeshi film actress.

Biography
Kajori acted in Mohanayok in 1984 where her co-star was Bulbul Ahmed This film won National Film Award in one category. She also acted in Noyoner Alo in 1984 where her co-star was Zafar Iqbal. This film won National Film Award in one category too.

Selected filmography
 Mahanayak
 Noyoner Alo
 Kajol Lota
 Fuleshwari

References

Bangladeshi film actresses
Living people
Year of birth missing (living people)